Taracticus octopunctatus is a species of robber fly in the family Asilidae. It is found in the eastern United States.

References

External links

 

Asilidae
Articles created by Qbugbot
Insects described in 1823